= Jatan Sansthan =

Jatan's logo

Jatan Sansthan is a grassroots Indian non-governmental organisation (NGO) based in the state of Rajasthan.
